Mecyna biternalis is a species of moth in the family Crambidae. It is found in Bulgaria and Turkey.

References

Moths described in 1862
Spilomelinae
Moths of Europe
Moths of Asia